Thout 28 - Coptic Calendar - Thout 30

The twenty-ninth day of the Coptic month of Thout, the first month of the Coptic year. On a common year, this day corresponds to September 26, of the Julian Calendar, and October 9, of the Gregorian Calendar. This day falls in the Coptic season of Akhet, the season of inundation.

Commemorations

Feasts 

 Monthly commemoration of the Feasts of the Annunciation, Nativity, and Resurrection

Saints 

 The martyrdom of Saint Arbsima, her mother Agatha, and the Seventy-two Virgins 
 The martyrdom of Saint Febronia the Nun

References 

Days of the Coptic calendar